Silvério José Néri (Coari, Silvério José Nery; 8 October 1858 – 23 June 1934) was a Brazilian soldier and politician who was a federal deputy from 1897 to 1899, governor of the state of Amazonas from 1900 to 1903 and a senator from 1904 to 1930.

Early years
His father was Silvério Néri and his mother was Maria Antony Néri.
One of his brothers, Antônio Constantino Néri, was senator from 1901 to 1904 and then succeeded him as governor of Amazonas.
Another brother, Raimundo Constantino Néri, was a federal deputy from 1903 to 1905.
Silvério José Néri completed his secondary education at the Diocesan Seminary of Manaus, then attended the Praia Vermelha Military Academy in Rio de Janeiro, where he qualified as a surveyor. He returned to Manaus, and soon after joined the Liberal Party and retired from the army.
He married Maria Maquiné da Silva, with whom he had six children.

Néri was elected provincial deputy in 1882 and was reelected in 1886, holding office until 1889. The Republic was declared on 15 November 1889.
He was elected state representative in 1893, holding office until 1896. 
He was elected federal deputy for 1897 to 1899. 
He was elected to the federal Senate in 1900, but left this position when he was elected governor of Amazonas the same year, succeeding José Cardoso Ramalho Júnior.

Governor of Amazonas

Silvério José Néri took office on 23 July 1900.

He intended to centralise the public administration, and therefore abolished the four departments into which the state had been divided.
To strengthen the General Secretariat of the state he appointed as secretary general the retired Colonel Antônio Clemente Ribeiro Bittencourt.
He attempted to consolidate the state's debt by issuing 7% bearer bonds redeemable in ten years.
Under pressure the government was forced to cut the rate to 5% and extend the period to 30 years.

At the time Acre belonged to Bolivia, but was mainly occupied by Brazilian rubber tappers.
In July 1899 the Brazilians in Acre declared the Independent Republic of Acre.
This was quickly dissolved by troops sent by the Brazilian government.
Bolivia sent a small military mission to occupy Acre.
Néri dispatched an expedition to Acre led by the journalist Orlando Correia Lopes.
It known as the "Poets Expedition" due to the intellectuals among its members, which declared a second Independent Republic of Acre in November 1900.
The republic was overthrown by Bolivian troops.
Bolivian president José Manuel Pando obtained approval from his Congress on 21 December 1901 for a plan under which an Anglo-American "Bolivian syndicate" would obtain a long term lease for rubber extraction in Acre.
José Plácido de Castro was given command of an armed uprising that eventually took control of Acre on 24 January 1903.
The Treaty of Petrópolis was signed on 17 November 1903 redefining the border between Bolivia and Brazil and creating the territory of Acre, separate from Amazonas.

Néri enforced processing of rubber in Amazonas, rather than shipping the raw rubber downstream to Pará to be processed for export.
In June 1903 he inaugurated the Port of Manaus operated by the Manaus Harbour limited company. 
He also funded new shipping lines serving various ports in the interior.
One of Néri's last acts was to inaugurate a new building for the Públio Bittencourt School.

Later years

Silvério José Néri left office on 2 December 1903.
He resigned before the end of his term since the state constitution did not allow a governor to be succeeded by a close relative, and his brother planned to run for election.
The deputy governor Francisco Benedito da Fonseca Coutinho headed the government until 23 July 1904, then handed over to his brother Antônio Constantino Néri.
In 1904 Silvério José Néri returned to the Senate, where he was reelected in consecutive elections until 1930.
He died in Manaus on 23 June 1934.

Notes

Sources

1858 births
1934 deaths
Governors of Amazonas (Brazilian state)
Members of the Legislative Assembly of Amazonas
Members of the Chamber of Deputies (Brazil) from Amazonas
Members of the Federal Senate (Brazil)
Liberal Party (Brazil, 1985) politicians